Joseph "Jef" Nelis (1 April 1917 – 12 April 1994) was a Belgian footballer, born in Tutbury, Staffordshire, England, who played as a striker for Royal Berchem Sport. He was picked for the World Cup in 1938 in France, but did not play. However, he played two games and scored two goals in 1940 for Belgium.

Honours 
 International in 1940 (2 caps and 2 goals)
 Picked for the 1938 World Cup (did not play)

References 

Belgium international footballers
Belgian footballers
1938 FIFA World Cup players
K. Berchem Sport players
Royale Union Saint-Gilloise players
1917 births
1994 deaths
Association football forwards
People from Tutbury